Spong Wood is a   nature reserve west of Stelling Minnis in Kent. It is managed by Kent Wildlife Trust.

Common trees in this coppiced wood include sweet chestnut, oak, hornbeam and hazel. Orchids can be found on the high slopes and ramsons lower down.

There is access by footpaths to its western corner.

References

Kent Wildlife Trust